Alberto Babo (born 1 September 1947) is a Portuguese basketball coach. He was the coach of FC Porto, from 2006 to 2009.

In 2009, Babo moved to Petro de Luanda in Angola. He coached Interclube from 2013 until 2018.

References

1974 births
FC Porto basketball coaches
Living people
Portuguese basketball coaches
Atlético Petróleos de Luanda (basketball) coaches
G.D. Interclube basketball coaches